Aliya, Aaliyah, Alia or Aliyah ( or ) is an Arabic feminine given name. It is the feminine of the name Ali, meaning "exalted".

People
 Aliya bint Ali (1911–1950), Queen of Iraq
 Aliyah bint Abdallah al-Mansur, was the daughter of Abbasid caliph Al-Mansur from his spouse Aliyah al-Umayyah.
 Aliyah bint al-Mahdi, was the daughter of Abbasid caliph Al-Mahdi (r. 775–785) from his concubine Bahtariyah.
 Aliya (actress) (born 1992), Chinese actress
 Aliya LeeKong (born 1978), American chef, television personality, and author
 Aliya Moldagulova (1925–1944), Soviet and Kazakh sniper
 Aliya Mustafina (born 1994), Russian artistic gymnast
 Aliya Yussupova (born 1984), Kazakh rhythmic gymnast

See also
 Aaliyah (1979–2001), American singer, dancer, actress, and model 
 Aaliyah (given name)
 Aliyah (given name)
 Alia (name)
 Alya (name)
 Aliye, name
 Aila (name)
 Ali (name)

References

Arabic feminine given names